Events from the year 1979 in Kuwait.

Incumbents
Emir: Jaber Al-Ahmad Al-Jaber Al-Sabah
Prime Minister: Saad Al-Salim Al-Sabah

Events

Births
 1 January - Haya Al Shuaibi
 25 July - Khalaf Al Salamah.

See also
Years in Jordan
Years in Syria

References

 
Kuwait
Kuwait
Years of the 20th century in Kuwait
1970s in Kuwait